The Anarchist's Wife is a 2008 Spanish-Franco-German film directed by Maria Noelle and . It stars María Valverde, Juan Diego Botto and Ivana Baquero.

Plot 
The plot derives from the experience of a child's parents. Paloma's father, an anarchist, fought in Madrid against Francisco Franco's Nationalists during the Spanish Civil War. He was deported to a concentration camp, then fought for the French Resistance. His wife, with two young children, never gave up hope of seeing him again.

Cast

Release 
The film screened at the Filmfest München in June 2008, winning the festival's Bernhard Wicki Prize. It also screened at the 53rd Valladolid International Film Festival (Seminci) on 25 October 2008. The film was theatrically released in Spain under the title La mujer del anarquista on 23 January 2019. The German title was Die Frau des Anarchisten.

References

External links 

Review at AK Press

2008 films
Films about anarchism
2000s war drama films
Films shot in Madrid
Films shot in Cologne
World War II films based on actual events
Films about the French Resistance
Films scored by Zacarías M. de la Riva
Spanish Civil War films
2008 drama films